Rodney Adolphus Wilkes (11 March 1925 – 24 March 2014) was a weightlifter from Trinidad and Tobago. Nicknamed "The Mighty Midget" he remained relatively unknown outside of local competition until he won the gold medal at the 1946 Central American and Caribbean Games in Barranquilla, Colombia.

He was selected to represent his country at the 1948 Olympics in London where he competed in the featherweight division. At those Games he became the first athlete from Trinidad and Tobago to win an Olympic medal by taking the silver, behind Egyptian Mahmoud Fayad.

In 1951 Wilkes won the featherweight gold medal at the first Pan American Games in Buenos Aires. The next year he was again selected for the Olympics in Helsinki. On this occasion he won the bronze medal behind Rafael Chimishkyan and Nikolai Saksonov, both of the Soviet Union. After a brief period of retirement in 1953 Wilkes returned to competition and won gold at the 1954 British Empire and Commonwealth Games in Vancouver; four years later he won bronze at Games in Cardiff.

Wilkes final Olympic appearance came at the 1956 Melbourne Games. He continued competing until 1960 but retired for good when he failed to make the West Indies team for the Olympics in Rome. Following his retirement he became an electrician in his home city of San Fernando, Trinidad and Tobago. Wilkes died of prostate cancer at a San Fernando hospital in 2014, aged 89.

References

1925 births
2014 deaths
Trinidad and Tobago male weightlifters
Olympic weightlifters of Trinidad and Tobago
Weightlifters at the 1948 Summer Olympics
Weightlifters at the 1952 Summer Olympics
Weightlifters at the 1956 Summer Olympics
Olympic silver medalists for Trinidad and Tobago
Olympic bronze medalists for Trinidad and Tobago
Olympic medalists in weightlifting
Weightlifters at the 1954 British Empire and Commonwealth Games
Weightlifters at the 1958 British Empire and Commonwealth Games
Commonwealth Games gold medallists for Trinidad and Tobago
Commonwealth Games bronze medallists for Trinidad and Tobago
Pan American Games gold medalists for Trinidad and Tobago
Medalists at the 1952 Summer Olympics
Medalists at the 1948 Summer Olympics
Commonwealth Games medallists in weightlifting
Pan American Games medalists in weightlifting
Weightlifters at the 1951 Pan American Games
Medalists at the 1951 Pan American Games
Medallists at the 1954 British Empire and Commonwealth Games
Medallists at the 1958 British Empire and Commonwealth Games